Alev Ebüzziya Siesbye (born 30 August 1938) is a Turkish-Danish ceramic artist.  Siesbye designed ceramic wares for the ceramic companies Royal Copenhagen and Rosenthal AG.   In 2009, Siesbye was awarded the Chevalier de l'Ordre des Arts et des Lettres for her ceramic designs.

Biography

Siesbye was born in Istanbul on 30 August 1938.  After studying sculpture at the Istanbul Academy of Fine Arts from 1956-1958, she left for Germany where she worked in ceramic factories in Höhr-Grenzhausen.  She returned two years later to Istanbul to work in the Art Workshop of the Eczacibasi Ceramic Factories.  In 1962, she left Istanbul for Copenhagen and worked for the ceramic company Royal Copenhagen as an artist. She opened her own workshop in 1969.  She lived in Denmark until 1987, when she decided to go to Paris. From 1975 to 1990, she worked as a ceramic designer for Rosenthal AG and from 1984-2000 for Royal Copenhagen. In 2007, she became a designer for Pasabahce Glass Factories in Turkey and resides in Paris.

She has built an international reputation as a ceramist by modeling bowls.  In 2002, "A ceramics Universe/1964-2002,"  a retrospective exhibition of her works, was exhibited in the Turkish and Islamic Arts Museum in Istanbul and the Danish Museum of Decorative Art in Copenhagen.
She is in the collections of more than 34 major museums in the world.

Selected awards 
 1983 Eckersberg Medal
 1990 Louis Vuitton Möet Hennessy "Science pour l'art" Prize 
 1995 Prince Eugen Medal
 2009 Chevalier de l'Ordre des Arts et des Lettres
 2010 C.L. David's Honorary Legate

Personal exhibitions 
 1964 Danimarka Kraliyet Porcelen Fabrikaları Kopenhag
 1971 Galerie Birkdam Kopenhag
 1975 Museum of Decorative Arts Kopenhag
 1976 Hetjens Museum Dusseldorf
 1979 Gallery In-Art Amsterdam
 1981 Retrospektif Sergi, Kunstforeningen, Kopenhag
 1982 Grès, Maison du Danemark Paris
 1982 Kunstkammer Paul Köster, Mönchen-Gladbach
 1983 Kunstindustrimuseet Kopenhag
 1983 Röhsska Museum, Göteborg
 1984 Garth Clark Gallery, Los Angeles
 1984 Garth Clark Gallery, New York
 1985 Galerie Nord, Randers
 1987 Galerie Gummasons, Stockholm
 1987 Galeri Nev, Ankara
 1988 Galeri Nev, Urart Sanat Galerisi, İstanbul
 1990 Galerie Jonas, Neuchatel
 1991 Galerie Epona, Paris
 1991 Galerie Egelund, Kopenhag
 1992 Maison de la Céramique, Mulhouse
 1992 Garth Clark Gallery New York
 1992 Galeri Nev, Ankara
 1992 Gallery Besson, Londra
 1992 Galeri Nev, İstanbul
 1993 Galeri Nev, İstanbul/Ankara
 1994 Garth Clark Gallery, Los Angeles
 1994 Galerie Egelund, Kopenhag
 1995 Galeri Nev, Ankaraİstanbul
 1995 Galerie Osiris, Brüksel
 1996 Borreby Art Gallery, Borreby Slot, Skaelskör
 1997 Ayşe ve Ercümend Kalmık Vakfı, İstanbul
 1998 Yedi Sarı Çanak Ayşe ve Ercümend Kalmık Vakfı
 999 Galeri Nev, İstanbuL
 2000 Galerie Elise Toft, Kolding
 2001 Garth Clark Gallery, New York
 2002 Retrospektif Sergi, Kunstindustrimuseet, Kopenhag
 2002 Bir Seramik Evreni: 1964-2002, Retrospektif Sergi, Türk İslam Eserleri Müzesi, İstanbul
 2003 Galerie Besson, Londra
 2004 Galerie Puls, Brüksel
 2005 Retrospektif Sergi, Museu Nacional do Azulejo, Lizbon
 2005 Yufuku Gallery, Tokyo
 2006 Galeri Nev, Ankara
 2018 Galeri Nev, İstanbul

References 

20th-century Danish ceramists
Danish people of Turkish descent
Danish women ceramists
1938 births
Danish potters
Turkish ceramists
Living people
Women potters
Turkish women ceramists